Stoyan Ivanov may refer to:
 Stoyan Nikolov (Stoyan Nikolov Ivanov), Bulgarian wrestler
 Stoyan Ivanov (footballer), Bulgarian footballer